Lexington is an unincorporated community in Democrat Township, Carroll County, Indiana.

History
Lexington was laid out in 1835.

Geography

References

Unincorporated communities in Carroll County, Indiana
Unincorporated communities in Indiana